The inauguration of Zachary Taylor as the 12th president of the United States was held on Monday, March 5, 1849, at the East Portico of the United States Capitol in Washington, D.C. and was the second instance of an inauguration being rescheduled due to March 4 falling on a Sunday, the Christian sabbath. This was the 16th regular inauguration and marked the commencement of the only four-year term of both Zachary Taylor as president and Millard Fillmore as vice president. Taylor died  into this term, and Fillmore succeeded to the presidency. The presidential oath of office was administered by Chief Justice Roger B. Taney. Inauguration Day started off being cloudy with snow flurries, but turned to heavy snow during the inaugural balls.

Inaugural festivities
Three inaugural balls were held later that day. To accommodate the large numbers of guests anticipated to be at one of them, a temporary wooden building was built in the Judiciary Square plaza. The ticket price for the event was $10 cash; the menu included: terrapins, Charlotte Russe, oysters and Roman punch.

The "presidency" of David Rice Atchison
Due to the postponement of the swearing-in ceremony until March 5, various friends and colleagues of Senator David Atchison asserted that on March 4–5, 1849 he was acting president of the United States. They argued that, since both President James K. Polk and Vice President George Dallas ceased to hold their offices at noon on March 4, and since neither Taylor nor Fillmore had yet sworn their prescribed oath of office, both offices were vacant. As a result, they claimed, in accordance with the Presidential Succession Act of 1792, Atchison, by virtue of being the president pro tempore of the United States Senate, was the nation's acting chief executive during the interregnum. Historians, constitutional scholars and biographers all dismiss the claim.

See also

Presidency of Zachary Taylor
1848 United States presidential election

References

External links
More documents from the Library of Congress
Text of Taylor's Inaugural Address
Joseph Gungl's Inauguration Quadrille was played at President Taylor's inauguration and dedicated to Mrs. Taylor.

United States presidential inaugurations
1849 in American politics
1849 in Washington, D.C.
Inauguration
March 1849 events